The Indonesian Chess Championship is organized by PERCASI, the Indonesian Chess Federation. PERCASI was established in 1948 in Yogyakarta, although its official founding date is August 17, 1950, when its statutes and bylaws were enacted. Its offices were moved to Jakarta in 1955.

The first Indonesian championship recognized by PERCASI was held in Solo in 1953, although there are claims of a national championship having taken place in Semarang in 1952. Ardiansyah holds the record for most championships won with five. Since 1978, a women's championship has been held concurrently with the open championship.

Open championship winners

{| class="sortable wikitable"
! !! Year !! Place !! Champion
|-
| 1  || 1953    || Solo                 || Arovah Bachtiar
|-
| 2  || 1954    || Tegal      || 
|-
| 3  || 1955    || Jakarta                        ||Baris Hutagalung
|-
| 4  || 1956    || Magelang                       || Abubakar Baswedan
|-
| 5  || 1958    || Malang                         || cancelled
|-
| 6  || 1960    || Medan                          ||Baris Hutagalung
|-
| 7  || 1962    ||Jakarta||Arovah Bachtiar
|-
| 8  ||1964–1965|| Jakarta/Bandung                || Ong Yok Hwa
|-
| 9  || 1967    ||Jakarta||Arovah Bachtiar
|-
| 10 || 1969    || Banjarmasin                    || Ardiansyah
|-
| 11 || 1970    ||Jakarta||Ardiansyah
|-
| 12 || 1971    || Padang                         ||Arovah Bachtiar
|-
| 13 || 1972    ||Jakarta||Jacobus Sawandar Sampouw
|-
| 14 || 1973    || Denpasar                       || Johny Suwuh
|-
| 15 || 1974    ||Malang||Ardiansyah
|-
| 16 || 1975    ||Medan||Herman Suradiradja
|-
| 17 || 1976    ||Jakarta||Ardiansyah
|-
| 18 || 1978    || Yogyakarta/Jakarta||Edhi Handoko
|-
| 19 ||1979–1980|| Cipayung/Jakarta||Edhi Handoko
|-
| 20 || 1980    || Salatiga                       || Sutan Aritonang
|-
| 21 || 1982    ||Bandung||Utut Adianto
|-
| 22 || 1984    ||Jakarta||Edhi Handoko
|-
| 23 || 1986    || Mataram/Jakarta||
|-
| 24 || 1987    || Palu                           || Cerdas Barus
|-
| 25 || 1988    ||Salatiga||Ardiansyah
|-
| 26 || 1990    ||Banjarmasin||Nasib Ginting
|-
| 27 || 1991    || Ujung Pandang                  ||Edhi Handoko
|-
| 28 || 1992    ||Jakarta||Utut Adianto
|- 
| 29 || 1993    ||Bandung||Salor Sitanggang
|-
| 30 || 1994    ||Yogyakarta||Nasib Ginting
|- 
| 31 || 1995    || Palangkaraya                   || Awam Wahono
|-
| 32 || 1997    || Banda Aceh                     || Suyud Hartoyo
|-
| 33 || 1999    || Bekasi                         ||Cerdas Barus
|-
| 34 || 2001    ||Denpasar||Irwanto Sadikin
|-
| 35 || 2002    || Palembang                      ||Cerdas Barus
|-
| 36 || 2003    || Semarang                       || Junaid Pamungkas
|-
| 37 || 2005    || Tarakan ||Irwanto Sadikin
|-
| 38 || 2006    || Batam                          || Susanto Megaranto
|-
| 39 || 2007    || Surabaya                       ||Susanto Megaranto
|-
| 40 || 2009    ||Palangkaraya||Susanto Megaranto
|-
| 41 || 2010    || Manado                         ||Susanto Megaranto
|-
| 42 || 2011    ||Palembang||Salor Sitanggang
|-
| 43 || 2013    ||Jakarta||Pitra Andika
|-
| 44 || 2014    || Makassar                       || Tirta Chandra Purnama
|-
| 45 || 2015    ||Jakarta || Sean Winshand Cuhendi
|-
| 46 || 2017    ||Bogor || Novendra Priasmoro
|-
| 47 || 2018    ||Banda Aceh || Mohamad Ervan
|-
| 48 || 2019    ||Ambon || Muhamad Agus Kurniawan
|}

Women's championship winners

{| class="sortable wikitable"
! !! Year !! Place !! Champion
|-
| 1  || 1978    ||Yogyakarta||Hanik Maria
|-
| 2  || 1979    ||Cipayung||Imasniti
|-
| 3  || 1980    ||Salatiga||
|-
| 4  || 1982    ||Bandung||Darmayanti Tamin
|-
| 5  || 1984    ||Jakarta||Lindri Juni Wijayanti
|-
| 6  || 1986    ||Mataram||Darmayanti Tamin
|-
| 7  || 1987    ||Palu||Betty Makalew
|-
| 8  || 1988    ||Salatiga||Lindri Juni Wijayanti
|-
| 9  || 1990    ||Banjarmasin||Lindri Juni Wijayanti
|-
| 10 || 1991    || Ujung Pandang                  ||Lindri Juni Wijayanti
|-
| 11 || 1992    ||Jakarta||Suzana Widiastuti
|- 
| 12 || 1993    ||Bandung||Maria Lucia Ratnasari Sulistya
|-
| 13 || 1994    ||Yogyakarta||Lisa Karlina Lumongdong
|- 
| 14 || 1995    ||Palangkaraya||Maria Lucia Ratnasari Sulistya
|-
| 15 || 1997    ||Banda Aceh||Elizabeth Musung
|-
| 16 || 1999    ||Bekasi||Ai Zakiah
|-
| 17 || 2001    ||Denpasar||Ai Zakiah
|-
| 18 || 2002    ||Palembang||Evi Lindiawati
|-
| 19 || 2003    ||Semarang||Susianah Handayani
|-
| 20 || 2005    ||Tarakan||Lisa Karlina Lumongdong
|-
| 21 || 2006    ||Batam||Irene Kharisma Sukandar
|-
| 22 || 2007    ||Surabaya||Irene Kharisma Sukandar
|-
| 23 || 2009    ||Palangkaraya||Irene Kharisma Sukandar
|-
| 24 || 2010    ||Manado||Irene Kharisma Sukandar
|-
| 25 || 2011    ||Palembang||Yemi Jelsen
|-
| 26 || 2013    ||Jakarta||Baiq Vina Lestari
|-
| 27 || 2014    ||Makassar||Medina Warda Aulia
|-
| 28 || 2015    ||Jakarta||Chelsie Monica Ignesias Sihite
|-
| 29 || 2017    ||Bogor || Aay Aisyah Anisah
|-
| 30 || 2018    ||Banda Aceh || Ummi Fisabilillah
|-
| 31 || 2019    ||Ambon || Fariha Mariroh
|}

References

Chess national championships
Women's chess national championships
Chess in Indonesia
Recurring sporting events established in 1953
Recurring sporting events established in 1978
1953 in chess
1978 in chess
Chess
Chess
Chess